This is a list of airports in the Cook Islands, sorted by location.

The Cook Islands are a self-governing parliamentary democracy in free association with New Zealand. The Cook Islands consists of 15 islands in the South Pacific Ocean.



Airports 
All airports feature scheduled services. International airports are marked in bold.

See also 
 Transport in the Cook Islands
 List of airports by ICAO code: N#NC - Cook Islands
 Wikipedia:WikiProject Aviation/Airline destination lists: Oceania#Cook Islands (New Zealand)

References

External links 
Lists of airports in the Cook Islands:
Great Circle Mapper
FallingRain.com
World Aero Data
Aircraft Charter World
The Airport Guide
A-Z World Airports
Official website

Cook Islands
 
Airports
Cook Islands